Spastic gait is a form of gait abnormality. Among the treatment options is chemodenervation.


Presentation
Asymmetric foot dragging.About Physical Therapy

Conditions associated with a spastic gait
 Brain tumor
 Brain abscess
 Sturge–Weber syndrome
 Cerebral palsy
 Cerebrovascular accident
 Multiple sclerosis

References

Gait abnormalities